This is a season-by-season list of records compiled by Robert Morris in men's ice hockey.

Robert Morris University has made one appearance in the NCAA Tournament.

Season-by-season results

Note: GP = Games played, W = Wins, L = Losses, T = Ties

* Winning percentage is used when conference schedules are unbalanced.

Footnotes

References

 
Robert Morris
Robert Morris Colonials ice hockey seasons